The molecular formula C12H18 (molar mass: 162.27 g/mol) may refer to:

 Cyclododecatriene
 Diisopropylbenzenes
 1,2-Diisopropylbenzene
 1,3-Diisopropylbenzene
 1,4-Diisopropylbenzene
 Hexamethylbenzene
 Iceane
 2-Phenylhexane
 1,3,5-Triethylbenzene